Alive II is the second live album by American hard rock band Kiss, released on October 14, 1977, by Casablanca Records. The band had released three albums (Destroyer, Rock and Roll Over, and Love Gun) since the previous live outing, the  1975 release Alive!, so they drew upon the variety of new tracks, with Eddie Kramer producing. The album is one of the best selling in the Kiss discography, being the band's first to be certified double platinum in February 1996, the same month the Kiss reunion was announced. It has remained a solid seller in the US in the Soundscan era, selling over 300,000 copies from 1991 and to March 2012.

Album information
The origins of Alive II go back to early 1977 when the band's manager Bill Aucoin suggested that Kramer record a live album during the evening show at Budokan Hall in Tokyo, Japan on April 2, 1977. The plan was to release a live album to give Kiss some much-deserved time off before recording the album that would become Love Gun later that autumn. Kramer finished work on the album, but Casablanca and Kiss deemed it unusable, and the band forged ahead with their Love Gun sessions.

Most of the live tracks on Alive II were recorded during the band's August 26–28 shows at the Forum while on their Love Gun Tour. The 3 p.m. soundchecks at the August 26 and 27 shows were recorded and later used on the album (i.e. "I Stole Your Love" with crowd noise being dubbed in later). "Beth" and "I Want You" were lifted from the aborted Japanese live album and used on the finished Alive II. As the band did not want to duplicate songs included on Alive!, the songs chosen for the three live sides of the album were all drawn from Kiss' three preceding studio albums: Destroyer, Rock and Roll Over and Love Gun.

On the original double album, the songs on side 4 (tracks 6–10 on the second CD) are tracks recorded live without the audience at Capitol Theatre in Passaic, New Jersey,  and overdubbed and mixed at Electric Lady Studios in New York City in September 13–16, 1977. Although Ace Frehley was originally credited for lead guitar on the studio tracks, the remastered version released in 1997 confirmed what had been speculated by Kiss fans for years: Bob Kulick played lead guitar on the tracks "All American Man", "Rockin' in the U.S.A." and "Larger Than Life". "Rockin' in the USA" had references to both the previous year's "Spirit of 76" main act European debut in England, France, Germany and Denmark and to that spring's Japan debut. Frehley's sole involvement for the studio songs was "Rocket Ride" (originally written for a solo album), on which he sang lead vocals and played both guitar and bass guitar. Paul Stanley played all guitars on "Any Way You Want It", which was originally recorded by the Dave Clark Five in 1964.

Several early copies of the album's cover featured a rare misprint of three additional songs ("Take Me", "Hooligan" and "Do You Love Me?") with a slightly altered song order. None of these additional songs appeared on the LP. On the misprint, "Take Me" is after "Detroit Rock City", with "King of the Night Time World" appearing after "Ladies Room" on side one. Side two features "Hooligan" after "Shock Me", which is placed after "Hard Luck Woman". On side three, "Do You Love Me?" appears after "God of Thunder", with "Beth" between "I Want You" and "Shout It Out Loud". "Hooligan" and "Take Me" were performed on the 1977 Love Gun tour, and "Do You Love Me?" was performed on the Japanese tour that same year, making their consideration for inclusion with the second live album possible.

Promotional items
The original vinyl issue of Alive II was a 2-LP set with a gatefold cover and picture inner sleeves. Continuing the Kiss tradition of including promotional items with their albums, Alive II was packaged with a full-color booklet titled "The Evolution of Kiss" and a set of temporary transfer tattoos in a cartoon style. The tattoos depicted the band logo, Kiss Army logo, band member heads, member signatures and symbols. The symbols were meant to represent the four personas of the group and included a skull and crossbones for Gene Simmons, a rose and star with an eye for Stanley, a Saturn-like planet and block print-style "ACE" for Frehley, and a drum and cat's head for Peter Criss. The rose and "ACE" are copies of Stanley and Frehley's actual tattoos, respectively. A merchandise order form was also included with the album, listing an array of official Kiss merchandise as well as a chance to "enlist" in the Kiss Army. The inner sleeves depicted crazed Kiss fans in a confetti storm and the band's album discography to date.

Re-release
Alive II was originally reissued as a double-CD set in what has now become known as a "fatboy" 2CD case. When the Kiss back catalog was remastered, it was housed in a slimline 2CD case and, in keeping with the rest of the reissue program, had the artwork restored. This included the set of tattoos. The booklet "The Evolution of Kiss"' and the picture inner sleeves were incorporated as part of the CD booklet. Alive II was re-released in 2006 as part of Kiss Alive! 1975-2000. It included "Rock and Roll All Nite" (single edit version) as a bonus track. The short running time of Alive II allowed for a single CD edition in the latest release.

Reception

Coming off of a period of extensive touring, Alive II received a huge fan response and critical acclaim, reaching the No. 7 spot on the Billboard 200 chart.

In a contemporary review, John Swenson of Rolling Stone criticized Kiss for copying the live performances of The Rolling Stones and The Who, but acknowledged the band's "improved instrumental technique" and attitude, concluding that "Alive II captures the essence of live rock & roll very well".
Modern reviews are generally positive. Critic Greg Prato of AllMusic remarked that several tracks such as "Detroit Rock City", "Shock Me" and "Shout It Out Loud" featured an "adrenaline-charged" vibe. He lauded the album for showing the group in its element as an "exciting live band". Jason Josephes of Pitchfork considered Alive II "not a bad album, but definitely not essential." Martin Popoff called it "a loud-and-proud document to what would be, hands down, the most exciting year for the communion of this band and their Kiss Army planned fans."

Track listing
All credits adapted from the original release.

Notes
Tracks 1–8, 11, 13 and 15 recorded at The Forum, Los Angeles, CA, August 26–28, 1977
Tracks 9, 10 and 16–20 recorded at the Capitol Theatre, Passaic, NJ, September 13–16, 1977 and Electric Lady Studios, New York, NY
Tracks 12, 14 recorded at Budokan Hall, Tokyo, Japan, April 2, 1977

Personnel
Kiss
Paul Stanley – vocals, rhythm guitar (all guitars and bass on "Any Way You Want It")
Gene Simmons – vocals, bass (rhythm guitar on "Larger Than Life")
Peter Criss – drums, vocals
Ace Frehley – lead guitar, vocals (all guitars and bass on "Rocket Ride")

Additional personnel
Eddie Balandas – introduction on "Detroit Rock City"
Bob Kulick – lead guitar on "All American Man", "Rockin' in the U.S.A" and "Larger Than Life"

Production
Eddie Kramer – producer, engineer, mixing
Kiss – co-producer
Corky Stasiak – engineer
Neil Dorfsman – mixing

Charts

Weekly charts

Year-end charts

Singles

Certifications

References

External links
 

1977 live albums
Albums produced by Eddie Kramer
Albums recorded at Electric Lady Studios
Kiss (band) live albums
Casablanca Records live albums
Sequel albums